Eucalyptus sturgissiana, commonly known as steel box or Ettrema mallee, is a species of mallee that is endemic to a small area of New South Wales. It has smooth, mottled bark, narrow lance-shaped adult leaves, often with juvenile leaves persisting in the crown, flower buds in groups of seven, white flowers and hemispherical to bell-shaped fruit.

Description
It has smooth, mottled greyish to brownish or pink bark that is shed in ribbons.

Taxonomy and naming
Eucalyptus sturgessiana was first formally described in 1972 by Lawrie Johnson and Donald Blaxell in Contributions from the New South Wales National Herbarium, from specimens they collected near the Nowra to Braidwood Road in 1970. The specific epithet honours James H. Sturgiss (1890-1983) who "discovered most of the known populations" of this species.

Distribution and habitat
Steel box usually grows in small, pure stands on sandstone plateaus, mostly in the Morton National Park.

References

sturgissiana
Myrtales of Australia
Flora of New South Wales
Plants described in 1972